Houstonville is an unincorporated community in the Eagle Mills Township of Iredell County, North Carolina, United States. Houstonville was founded in 1789 by Christopher Houston and is the second oldest town in Iredell County after the county seat, Statesville.

History
Captain Christopher Houston (1744-1837), an American Revolutionary War veteran, was instrumental in establishing Iredell County in 1788 and the county seat of Statesville in 1789.  He recognized the need for a town in the northern end of the county on Hunting Creek, so he founded Houstonville in 1789.  (Houston moved to Tennessee in 1815.)

Other early settlers in Houstonville include:  
 Captain Thomas Cadet Young (1732-1829), American Revolutionary War veteran, settled in the area in about 1778
 Captain Placebo Houston (1779-1859), born and died in Houstonville, son of Christopher Houston who married daughter of Thomas Cadet Young 
 Solomon Hayes (1750-1830) 
 
 Col Francis Young (1779-1854), veteran of the War of 1812, buried in the Young Family Cemetery just north of Houstonville

Christopher Houston and most of the original settlers in this area ran small plantations and owned slaves.  Christopher Houston owned six and Thomas Young owned 13 slaves in 1790.

The first post office was established in Houstonville on October 1, 1804 with Christopher Houston as postmaster.   This post office was the second post office in Iredell County (after the Statesville Post Office) and served continually until February 9, 1869.   A post office was re-established on March 5, 1883 with Mary C. Dalton as post master.  This post office continued until November 30, 1955.

The following historic sites are located in or near Houstonville and listed on the National Register of Historic Places.
 Ebenezer Academy a log school house established in 1821 and still standing
 Bethesda Presbyterian Church, Session House and Cemetery, established in 1853
 Daltonia, located near Houstonville and built by John H. Dalton in 1858
 Welch-Nicholson House and Mill Site, located near Houstonville and built in 1795

Other notable sites in or near Houstonville include:
 New Hope Baptist Church and Cemetery 
 Young Family Cemetery, which includes American Revolutionary War graves, dating from 1797
 Hayes Family Cemetery, near Houstonville school, Road # 1830
 Zion Hill African Methodist Episcopal Zion Church and Cemetery

References

 Mary Hunter Kennedy Papers #3242, Southern Historical Collection, The Wilson Library, University of North Carolina at Chapel Hill.

Unincorporated communities in Iredell County, North Carolina
Unincorporated communities in North Carolina